Teamwork is the collaborative effort of a group to achieve a common goal or to complete a task in the most effective and efficient way. This concept is seen within the greater framework of a team, which is a group of interdependent individuals who work together towards a common goal. The four key characteristics of a team include a shared goal, interdependence, boundedness and stability, the ability to manage their own work and internal process, and operate in a bigger social system.  Basic requirements for effective teamwork are an adequate team size.  The context is important, and team sizes can vary depending upon the objective. A team must include at least 2 or more members, and most teams range in size from 2 to 100.  Sports teams generally have fixed sizes based upon set rules, and work teams may change in size depending upon the phase and complexity of the objective. Teams need to be able to leverage resources to be productive (i.e. playing fields or meeting spaces, scheduled times for planning, guidance from coaches or supervisors, support from the organization, etc.), and clearly defined roles within the team in order for everyone to have a clear purpose.  Teamwork is present in any context where a group of people are working together to achieve a common goal. These contexts include an industrial organization (formal work teams), athletics (sports teams), a school (classmates working on a project), and the healthcare system (operating room teams). In each of these settings, the level of teamwork and interdependence can vary from low (e.g. golf, track and field), to intermediate (e.g. baseball, football), to high (e.g. basketball, soccer), depending on the amount of communication, interaction, and collaboration present between team members. E. g.  Team work coordinates the work as early as possible

History 
The Oxford English Dictionary records the use of "team-work" in the context of a team of draught animals as early as 1800.

Even though collaborative work among groups of individuals is very prominent today, that was not the case over half a century ago. The shift from the typical assembly line to organizational models that contained increasing amounts of teamwork first came about during World War I and World War II, in an effort for countries to unite their people. The movement towards teamwork was mostly due to the Hawthorne studies, a set of studies conducted in the 1920s and 1930s that suggested positive aspects of teamwork in an organizational setting. After organizations recognized the value of teamwork and the positive effects it had on companies, entire fields of work shifted from the typical assembly line to the contemporary  High Performance Organizational Model.

Effective teamwork characteristics
There are certain characteristics that a team must have to work effectively. These characteristics are interrelated.

It is imperative that group cohesion is strong within the team. There is a positive relationship between group cohesion and performance.

Communication is another vital characteristic for effective teamwork. Members must be able to effectively communicate with each other to overcome obstacles, resolve conflict, and avoid confusion. Communication increases cohesion.

Communication is important within teams to clearly define the team's purpose so that there is a common goal. Having a common goal will increase cohesion because all members are striving for the same objective and will help each other achieve their goals.

Commitment is another important characteristic for teams. It occurs when members are focused on achieving the team's common goal.

Accountability is necessary to ensure milestones are reached and that all members are participating. Holding members accountable increases commitment within team relations.

Basic team dynamics
Basic team dynamics include:
 Open communication to avoid conflicts.
 Effective coordination to avoid confusion and the overstepping of boundaries.
 Efficient cooperation to perform the tasks in a timely manner and produce the required results, especially in the form of workload sharing.
 High levels of interdependence to maintain high levels of trust, risk-taking, and performance.
All these teamwork conditions lead to the team turning in a finished product. A way to measure if the teamwork was effective, the organization must examine the quality of the output, the process, and the members' experience. Specifically, the teamwork can be deemed efficient if: the output met or exceeded the organization's standard; if the process the team chose to take helped them reach their goals; and if the members are reporting high levels of satisfaction with the team members as well as the processes which the team followed.

Processes 

Specific teamwork processes have been identified fall into three categories:

Transition processes
These processes occur between periods of action. In this period, the team members can evaluate their overall performance as a team as well as on an individual level, give feedback to each other, make clarifications about the upcoming tasks, and make any changes that would improve the process of collaborating.
 Task Analysis
 Goal Specification
 Strategy Formulation
 result oriented group

Action processes
These processes take place when the team steps to accomplish its goals and objectives. In this stage, team members keep each other informed about their progress and their responsibilities, while helping one another with certain tasks. Feedback and collaborative work continues to exist in high levels throughout this process.
 Monitoring progress toward goals
 Systems Monitoring
 Team Monitoring and Backup Behavior
 Coordination

Interpersonal processes
These processes are present in both action periods and transition periods, and occur between team members. This is a continuous process, in which team members must communicate any thoughts and/or feelings concerning either another team member or a manner in which a task is being performed. Furthermore, team members encourage and support each other on their individual tasks.
 Conflict management
 Motivation and Confidence building
 Affect Management
Teamwork performance generally improves when a team passes through these processes, since processes like these enhance coordination and communication between the team members and therefore increase teamwork and collaborative work.

Training to improve teamwork 
Overall, teamwork and performance can be enhanced through specific training that targets the individual team members and the team as a whole. Bruce Tuckman proposed a team developmental model that separated the stages of a team's lifespan and the level of teamwork for each stage:
 Forming
 This stage is described by approach/avoidance issues, as well as internal conflicts about being independent vs. wanting to be a part of the team.
 Team members usually tend to 'play it safe' and minimize their risk taking in case something goes wrong.
 Teamwork in this stage is at its lowest levels.
 Storming
 The second stage is characterized by a competition for power and authority, which is the source of most of the conflicts and doubts about the success of the team.
 If teamwork is low in this stage, it is very unlikely that the team will get past their conflicts. If there is a high degree of teamwork and willingness to collaborate, then the team might have a brighter future.
 Norming
 The third stage is characterized by increasing levels of solidarity, interdependence, and cohesiveness, while simultaneously making an effort to adjust to the team environment.
 This stage shows much higher levels of teamwork that make it easier for the above characteristics to occur.
 Performing
 This final stage of team development includes a comfortable environment in which team members are effectively completing tasks in an interdependent and cohesive manner.
 This stage is characterized by the highest levels of comfort, success, interdependence, and maturity, and therefore includes the highest levels of teamwork.

Enhancing teamwork
A manner in which organizational psychologists measure teamwork is through the Knowledge, Skills, and Abilities (KSA) Teamwork Test. The KSA Teamwork Test was developed by Michael Stevens and Michael Campion in 1994 and it assesses the knowledge, skills, and abilities (KSA) of people wanting to join a team. Specifically, the KSA is a 35-item test that is designed to measure 14 individual KSA requirements for teamwork, especially within formal teams (i.e. those with per-designated tasks), since self-managing teams have a need for high levels of teamwork. Overall, the KSA is separated into two main categories: The Interpersonal KSAs that contain items such as Conflict Resolution and Communication, and the Self-Management KSAs that include items such as Goal Setting and Task Coordination. The fact that the KSA focuses on team-oriented situations and on knowledge of appropriate behaviors instead of personality characteristics makes the test appropriate to assess teamwork and team-specific behavior. Furthermore, it makes it appropriate for organizations to figure out their personnel's level of teamwork, and ways in which they can improve their teamwork and communication skills.

Drawbacks and benefits 
Utilizing teamwork is sometimes unnecessary and can lead to teams not reaching their performance peak. Some of those disadvantages include:
 Social loafing: This phenomenon appears when an individual working in a group places less effort than they can towards a task. This can create an inequality between the amount of work other individuals are placing within the team, therefore can create conflict and lead to lower levels of performance. 
 Behavioral conflicts or ingrained individualism: Employees in higher organizational levels have adapted to their positions at the top that require more individualism, and therefore have trouble engaging in collaborative work. This creates a more competitive environment with a lack of communication and higher levels of conflict. This disadvantage is mostly seen organizations that utilize teamwork in an extremely hierarchical environment.
 Individual tasks: Certain tasks do not require teamwork, and are more appropriate for individual work. By placing a team to complete an 'individual task', there can be high levels of conflict between members which can damage the team's dynamic and weaken their overall performance.
 Groupthink: A psychological phenomenon that occurs within a group of people when conflict is avoided and the desire for cohesiveness is greater than the desire for best decisions. When a team is experiencing groupthink, alternative solutions will not be suggested due to fear of rejection or disagreement within the group. Group members will measure success based on the harmony of their group and not by the outcome of their decisions. One way to counteract groupthink is to have members of a group be from diverse backgrounds and have different characteristics (gender, age, nationality). Another way to avoid groupthink is to require each member to suggest different ideas.

Working in teams has also shown to be very beneficial. Some of these advantages include:
 Problem solving: A group of people can bring together various perspectives and combine views and opinions to rapidly and effectively solve an issue. Due to the team's culture, each team member has a responsibility to contribute equally and offer their unique perspective on a problem to arrive at the best possible solution. Overall, teamwork can lead to better decisions, products, or services. The effectiveness of teamwork depends on the following six components of collaboration among team members: communication, coordination, balance of member contributions, mutual support, effort, and cohesion. 
 Healthy competition: A healthy competition in groups can be used to motivate individuals and help the team excel.
 Relationship development: A team that continues to work together will eventually develop an increased level of bonding. This can help members avoid unnecessary conflicts since they have become well acquainted with each other through teamwork. By building strong relationships between members, team members' satisfaction with their team increases, therefore improving both teamwork and performance.
 Individual qualities: Every team member can offer their unique knowledge and ability to help improve other team members. Through teamwork the sharing of these qualities will allow team members to be more productive in the future.
 Motivation: Working collaboratively can lead to increased motivation levels within a team due to increasing accountability for individual performance. When groups are being compared, members tend to become more ambitious to perform better. Providing groups with a comparison standard increases their performance level thus encouraging members to work collaboratively.

Paulus describes additional benefits of teamwork:
 Shared workload
 Opportunity to achieve leadership and social satisfaction
 Sense of belonging to a successful team
 Ability to accomplish more than if team members worked individually

References

Further reading 

 
 
 
 
 
 
 
 
 
 

Collaboration
Group processes
Industrial and organizational psychology
Social groups
Organizational culture
Teams

eu:Lan-talde
it:Gruppo di lavoro
tr:Takım çalışması